Barar Deh may refer to:
 Barar Deh, Sari
 Barar Deh, Dodangeh, Sari County